Denkyira District is a former district council that was located in Central Region, Ghana. Originally created as an district council in 1975. However, on 1988, it was split off into two new district assemblies: Upper Denkyira District (capital: Dunkwa-On-Offin) and Twifo/Heman/Lower Denkyira District (capital: Twifo Praso). The district council was located in the northwest part of Central Region and had Dunkwa-On-Offin as its capital town.

References

Central Region (Ghana)

Districts of the Central Region (Ghana)